The 1928–29 League of Ireland was the eighth season of the League of Ireland. Bohemians were the defending champions.

Shelbourne won their second title.

Overview
Athlone Town were not re-elected to the League, while Drumcondra were elected.

Teams

Changes from 1927-28 season

Table

Results

Top goalscorers

See also 

 1928–29 FAI Cup

References

Ireland
League of Ireland seasons
Lea